Nasty Quacks is a 1945 Warner Bros. Merrie Melodies cartoon directed by Frank Tashlin. The cartoon was released on December 1, 1945, and stars Daffy Duck.

This was the final Daffy Duck cartoon, and the second to last overall, directed by Tashlin. The director is not credited as he had already left the studio. The voices of the male characters are performed by Mel Blanc. The film also introduced a love interest for Daffy.

Plot
The father of a suburban family gets a black duckling for his daughter, Agnes, who dotes on the duck. The duck quickly grows up to become Daffy, whose loud and obnoxious behavior drives the man to distraction, but Agnes defends her pet at every turn.

The father then buys Agnes a yellow duckling, who immediately becomes the sole focus of her affection. The father comes at Daffy with murder in his eyes and chases him around the house. Kicked out, Daffy vows to get rid of his competitor. At first, he tries to kill the duckling, but he has a pang of conscience and decides to let it grow to adult size before killing it. To speed the process along, he pours vitamins down the duckling's throat. The duckling instantly becomes a grown, white, female duck, leaving Daffy nonplussed.

The father walks down the stairs, laughing to himself, thinking he has chased Daffy out of the house. He is stunned, however, to see Daffy and the other duck, their ducklings bouncing around the dinner table. Daffy launches into one of his raucous stories as the short irises out.

Reception 
Animation historian Greg Ford writes, "A comparison might be made to the plot of the hit play The Man Who Came to Dinner, in which an insufferable dinner guest becomes incapacitated and overstays his welcome for endless, grueling months. Daffy, as Warner Bros.' blue-collar answer to George S. Kaufman and Moss Hart's patrician wordsmith Sheridan Whiteside, terrorizes the household not with acerbic putdowns but exuberant, palsy-walsy camaraderie... One of the cartoon's funniest bits finds the borderline bratty Agnes swooshing in to Daffy's defense before her father does the duck corporeal harm. While other animation directors showed an antsy reluctance to caricature females, Tashlin distinguished himself as an equal-opportunity exaggerator."

Home media
Nasty Quacks is available on the two-disc DVD The Essential Daffy Duck and  Looney Tunes Platinum Collection: Volume 3 DVD and Blu-Ray set.

See also 
 List of Daffy Duck cartoons
 Looney Tunes and Merrie Melodies filmography (1940–1949)

References

External links 
 
 

1945 animated films
1945 short films
1945 films
Short films directed by Frank Tashlin
Merrie Melodies short films
1940s Warner Bros. animated short films
Daffy Duck films
Films about pets
Films scored by Carl Stalling
Films produced by Edward Selzer